The Filipino boy band BGYO has performed in one concert tours, three fan meeting tours, twenty-two joint tours and concerts, twenty-six performances on award shows and specials, three showcases, and four concerts since their debut in 2021.

In the third quarter of 2022, BGYO embarked on their first ever mall tour—Best Time with BGYO Mall Tour. The band became the only Filipino act, alongside other 6 K-pop idols, to headline the first ever K-pop Halloween Concert in the Philippines—Hallyuween 2022 and made a history to be the first Filipino act to have a concert in the Metaverse—BGYO Celestial Spaces: H&M Concert from the Virtual Universe. As part of their second album Be Us campaign, the group embarked on a US Press promo tour, which includes their visit at the TikTok Headquarters in Los Angeles, their performance on the Wish USA Bus and a street performances at the Time Square and Union Square in New York City.

Tours

Concerts

Fanmeeting tours

Joint tours and concerts

Showcases

Street performances

Performances on award shows and specials

See also
2021 in Philippine music
2022 in Philippine music

Notes

References 

Lists of concert tours
Lists of events in the Philippines